The Romantic Young Lady is a 1955 British TV production. It was the first lead role given to Sylvia Syms.

Plot summary
In Madrid, a young woman dreams of escape.

Cast
Sylvia Syms as Rosaria
John Breslin as Pepe
Eric Lander as Emilio
Roger Gage as Mario
Marjorie Fielding as Dona Barbarita (Grandmother)
Margaret Boyd as Maria Pepa (The Maid)
Tony Britton as The Apparition (The Author)
Raymond Rollett as Don Juan
Olivia Irving as Irene (The Secretary)
Walter Horsbrugh as Guillermo
Joan Seton as Amalia (The Famous Dancer)

Production
The play had been filmed for British television in 1938.

Reception
The Guardian said Syms "acts with a rare intelligence and poise." The Manchester Evening News said it "had a great deal of charm". The Liverpool Echo said "in a part which was not exactly an easy one, Miss Syms gave a performance hinting at considerable talent."

The reception led to a number of offers for Syms, including a seven year contract with Associated British and a role in My Teenage Daughter.

References

External links
 

1955 television plays
British television plays
BBC Television shows
1930s television plays